The following radio stations broadcast on AM frequency 960 kHz: The U.S. Federal Communications Commission (FCC) classifies 960 AM as a regional frequency.  CFAC is the only station in Canada and the United States on 960 AM which broadcasts with more than 10,000 watts.

In Argentina 
 LRA6 in Mendoza

In Canada 
 CFAC in Calgary, Alberta - 50 kW, transmitter located at 
 CKNT in Mississauga, Ontario. Branded as “Sauga 960 AM”. Broadcasts 700W daytime / 104W nighttime

In Mexico 
 XEHK-AM in Guadalajara, Jalisco
 XEK-AM in Nuevo Laredo, Tamualipas
 XETPH-AM in Santa María Ocotán, Durango
 XEOZ-AM in Xalapa, Veracruz

In the United States

References

Lists of radio stations by frequency